Patrick J. Verschoore (born November 30, 1943) is a former Democratic member of the Illinois House of Representatives, representing the 72nd District since his appointment on March 29, 2003. He will not run for re-election in the 2016 general election.

References

External links
 Representative Patrick J. Verschoore (D) 72nd District at the Illinois General Assembly
 By session: 98th, 97th, 96th, 95th, 94th, 93rd
 
 Patrick J. Verschoore at Illinois House Democrats

1943 births
Living people
Politicians from Rock Island, Illinois
American plumbers
Democratic Party members of the Illinois House of Representatives
21st-century American politicians